Désirée Parfait Malonga (born September 26, 1981) is a Romanian actress and model. Malonga is best known in Romania for playing Désirée McLoud on the hit Prima TV comedy series Trăsniți din NATO. Her mother is half Romanian and half Greek and her father who studied medicine in Romania is from the Republic of the Congo.

Filmography

Personal life 
Désirée is raising alone the daughter from her past boyfriend. In 2012, she married Florin Maftei.

References

External links 
 

1981 births
Romanian film actresses
Romanian television actresses
Romanian people of Republic of the Congo descent
Romanian people of Greek descent
Living people
Actresses from Bucharest
21st-century Romanian actresses
Models from Bucharest